is a Japanese actress. She won the award for best supporting actress at the 10th Yokohama Film Festival for Ureshi Hazukashi Monogatari.

Filmography
 The Last Samurai (1974)
 Ureshi Hazukashi Monogatari (1988)
 Ladybyrinth (1997)

References

1950 births
Living people
Japanese actresses
People from Tokyo